Kok Lanas may refer to:
 , a town in Kota Bharu district, Kelantan, Malaysia
 Kok Lanas (state constituency)
 Kok Lanas (federal constituency)